The Chronicle of the Saxons is a Welsh-language chronicle running from 683 to 1197. One manuscript attributes it to Caradog of Llancarfan. It appears to consist primarily of passages of the Chronicle of the Princes and the Annals of Winchester, with other minor sources as well.

See also
 Brut y Brenhinedd, the Chronicle of the Kings
 Brut y Tywysogion, the Chronicle of the Princes
 Annales Cambriae, the Annals of Wales

References

External links

 Jesus 111 MS. (The Red Book of Hergest) 
 Peniarth 19 MS. 
 Peniarth 32 MS. 

Welsh chronicles
7th-century books
8th-century books
9th-century books
10th-century books
11th-century books
12th-century books